Laja River is a river in the Mexican state of Guanajuato in central Mexico. It measures 137 km long, rising in the Sierra Madre Occidental, first flowing east and then south to join the Apaseo near Celaya. The Laja then turns westward eventually joining the Lerma just east of Salamanca.

The Laja is impounded at Salitrillo, just downstream from San Miguel de Allende to form the Presa Allende (Allende Reservoir).

References

 The Columbia Gazetteer of North America,

Rivers of the Sierra Madre Occidental
Rivers of Guanajuato
Lerma River